Pinhead Gunpowder (also known as the West Side Highway EP) is the second eponymously titled extended play by the American punk rock band Pinhead Gunpowder. It was released on August 19, 2008, through Recess Records, the group's first release on Recess. Pinhead Gunpowder marked the band's first new release in over 5 years. The first pressings of the extended play were on green and blue vinyl.  All of the tracks were re-released on the 2009 compilation Kick Over the Traces.

Track listing

Vinyl colors include:
Dark Purple (Transparent)
Light Purple (Transparent)
Purple (Opaque)
Dark burgundy (Transparent)
Light Burgundy (Transparent)
Yellow (Transparent)
Green (Transparent)
Red(Transparent)
Dark Blue (Transparent)
Light Blue (Transparent)
Gray (Opaque) 
Dark Gray (Opaque)
Light Gray (Opaque)
Olive (Opaque)
Tan (Opaque)
White (Opaque)
Black (Opaque)--test press only

Personnel
 Aaron Cometbus - drums
 Billie Joe Armstrong - lead vocals, guitar
 Jason White - guitar, vocals
 Bill Schneider - bass, backing vocals

Additional performers
 Lauren - vocals on "On the Ave." (version one)

Production
 Chris Dugan - producer
 Aaron Cometbus - graphic design, artwork
 Bill Schneider - photography

2008 EPs
Pinhead Gunpowder albums